"So Good" is the lead single for the debut album How to Be a Lady: Volume 1 by dance-pop girl group Electrik Red. The single was released on February 3, 2009 in the US and internationally on April 7, 2009. The remix version features rapper Lil Wayne, both the original and remix versions have music videos and were included on the album. Billboard named the song #80 on their list of 100 Greatest Girl Group Songs of All Time.

Track listing 
Russian CD Single
So Good (Clean) – 3:32
So Good (Dirty) – 3:32
So Good (Instrumental) – 3:30

US Digital Download 1
So Good (Main Version) – 3:25

US Digital Download 2
So Good (Remix) (Feat. Lil Wayne) – 3:29

Chart performance

References

External links 
So Good (music video) Electrik Red official site
So Good (Remix featuring Lil Wayne) (music video) Electrik Red official site
Electrik Red official site

2009 singles
Electrik Red songs
Lil Wayne songs
Music videos directed by Melina Matsoukas
Songs written by Tricky Stewart
Songs written by The-Dream
Song recordings produced by Tricky Stewart
2009 songs
Def Jam Recordings singles
Song recordings produced by The-Dream